Mount Frontz is a prominent mountain in the western Wisconsin Range, Antarctica. It was mapped by the United States Geological Survey from surveys and U.S. Navy air photos, 1960–64, and was named by the Advisory Committee on Antarctic Names for Lieutenant Commander Leroy Frontz, an aircraft commander during U.S. Navy Operation Deep Freeze 1966 and 1967.

References

Mountains of Marie Byrd Land